Szathmary (or Szathmáry) is a Hungarian surname:

 Elemér Szathmáry (1926–1971), Hungarian swimmer
 Emőke Szathmáry (born 1944), Hungarian anthropologist, president of The University of Manitoba
 Eörs Szathmáry (born 1959), Hungarian evolutionary biologist
 Irving Szathmary (1907–1983), American arranger and composer best known for television themes, brother of William (Bill Dana)
 Louis Szathmary (1919–1996), Hungarian-American chef, restaurateur and writer
 William Szathmary (1924–2017), birth name of American comedian Bill Dana, brother of Irving
 Zsigmond Szathmáry (born 1939), Hungarian organist, pianist, composer, and conductor

See also 
 Szatmary

Hungarian-language surnames